Eochaid mac Domangairt (died c. 697) was a king of Dál Riata (modern western Scotland) in about 697. He was a member of the Cenél nGabráin, the son of Domangart mac Domnaill and father of Eochaid mac Echdach; Alpín mac Echdach may be a son of this younger Eochaid.

He is named in Dál Riata king-lists, the Duan Albanach and the Synchronisms of Flann Mainistrech. In some sources he is called Eochaid Crook-Nose (Riannamail), but modern readings take this as being a garbled reference to Fiannamail ua Dúnchado rather than an epithet.

The death of Eochu nepos Domnaill (Eochaid grandson of Domnall Brecc) is reported in the Annals of Ulster for 697, slain by Fiannamail ua Dúnchado.

References

 Anderson, Alan Orr, Early Sources of Scottish History A.D 500–1286, volume 1. Reprinted with corrections. Paul Watkins, Stamford, 1990. 
 Broun, Dauvit, The Irish Identity of the Kingdom of the Scots in the Twelfth and Thirteenth Centuries. Boydell, Woodbridge, 1999.

External links
CELT: Corpus of Electronic Texts at University College Cork includes the Annals of Ulster, Tigernach, the Four Masters and Innisfallen, the Chronicon Scotorum, the Lebor Bretnach (which includes the Duan Albanach), Genealogies, and various Saints' Lives. Most are translated into English, or translations are in progress.

697 deaths
Kings of Dál Riata
7th-century Irish monarchs
7th-century Scottish monarchs
Year of birth unknown